Douglas Colin Roy Baldwin (November 2, 1922 – July 10, 2007) was a Canadian professional ice hockey defenceman who played 24 games in the National Hockey League with the Toronto Maple Leafs, Detroit Red Wings and Chicago Black Hawks between 1945 and 1947. The rest of his career, which lasted from 1942 to 1959, was spent in various minor leagues. He was born in Winnipeg, Manitoba.

Career statistics

Regular season and playoffs

Awards and achievements
Turnbull Cup (MJHL) Championship (1941)
Memorial Cup Championship (1941)
Allan Cup Championship (1944)
Paul W. Loudon (USHL) Championship (1947)
Honoured Member of the Manitoba Hockey Hall of Fame

References

External links

1922 births
2007 deaths
Canadian expatriate ice hockey players in the United States
Canadian ice hockey defencemen
Chicago Blackhawks players
Cleveland Barons (1937–1973) players
Detroit Red Wings players
Grand Rapids Rockets players
Kansas City Pla-Mors players
Ontario Hockey Association Senior A League (1890–1979) players
Pittsburgh Hornets players
Quebec Aces (QSHL) players
Ice hockey people from Winnipeg
Toledo Mercurys players
Toronto Maple Leafs players
Washington Presidents players
Winnipeg Falcons players
Winnipeg Rangers players